The Narrabri Stellar Intensity Interferometer (NSII) was the first astronomical instrument to measure the diameters of a large number of stars at visible wavelengths. It was designed by (amongst others) Robert Hanbury Brown, who received the Hughes Medal in 1971 for this work. It was built by University of Sydney School of Physics and was located near the town of Narrabri in north-central New South Wales, Australia. Many of the components were constructed in the UK. The design was based on an earlier optical intensity interferometer built by Hanbury Brown and Richard Q. Twiss at Jodrell Bank in the UK. Whilst the original device had a maximum baseline of 10m, the NSII device consisted of a large circular track that allowed the detectors to be separated from 10 to 188m. The NSII operated from 1963 until 1974, and was used to measure the angular diameters of 32 stars.

See also 
 Lists of telescopes

References 

 The angular diameters of 32 stars, Mon. Not. R. Astron. Soc. Volume 167 pp 121–136 (1974)
 Hanbury Brown R, The intensity interferometer – its application to astronomy, Taylor & Francis, 1974

Telescopes
Interferometric telescopes
Science and technology in New South Wales
Astronomical observatories in New South Wales